The mental radio is a fictional object that features prominently in the Golden Age and some later adventures of DC Comics superheroine Wonder Woman. It was created by William Moulton Marston as an allegory for intuitive telepathy, or ESP, which he believed was a real phenomenon.

Fictional history
The mental radio device was created by the scientifically advanced Amazon nation on Paradise Island. It first appeared in Sensation Comics #3.

It was frequently used throughout the Golden Age as a means for Wonder Woman to maintain communications with her mother and fellow Amazons on Paradise Island and for Wonder Woman's allies Steve Trevor and Etta Candy to communicate in times of distress.

The mental radio was needed primarily as a receiver. Wonder Woman and her allies were shown to be able to broadcast their distress calls even when they were nowhere near a mental radio, but they had to sit down in front of a mental radio device in order to receive telepathic transmissions.

Although the character most frequently shown to broadcast distress calls via mental radio was Wonder Woman, typically in the form of an "electronic" word balloon with a tail emanating from her forehead, mental radio broadcasting was not originally considered a feature of her tiara but was instead something even Steve Trevor and Etta Candy could do, with electronic thought balloons similarly pointing at their foreheads.

Mental radios featured prominently in a plot by Nazi agent Fausta Grables to steal a device in order to eavesdrop on Wonder Woman and her companions.

The mental radio appeared less frequently after the Golden Age. By the later pre-Crisis adventures, only Wonder Woman was shown to possess a mental radio outside of Paradise Island, and it was installed in her invisible jet.

References
 Brown, Matthew J.   "Love Slaves and Wonder Women: Radical Feminism and Social Reform in the Psychology of William Moulton Marston", (Uncopyrighted manuscript) (2016): 1-39.
 Jett, Brett.  "Who Is Wonder Woman?", (Manuscript) (2009): "Allegories", pp 1-71.
 Lamb, Marguerite. "Who Was Wonder Woman? Long-ago LAW alumna Elizabeth Marston was the muse who gave us a superheroine". Boston University Alumni Magazine, Fall 2001.
 Valcour, Francinne.  "Manipulating The Messenger: Wonder Woman As An American Female Icon", Dissertation (2006): 1–372.

Wonder Woman
1941 in comics
Fiction about telepathy